Eva Dyrberg and Jelena Kostanić were the defending champions, but they did not compete in the Junior's this year.

Dája Bedáňová and María Emilia Salerni defeated Tatiana Perebiynis and Iroda Tulyaganova in the final, 6–1, 2–6, 6–2 to win the girls' doubles tennis title at the 1999 Wimbledon Championships.

Seeds

  Flavia Pennetta /  Roberta Vinci (semifinals)
  Dája Bedáňová /  María Emilia Salerni (champions)
  Erica Krauth /  Vanessa Krauth (second round)
  Anikó Kapros /  Aniela Mojzis (second round)
  Natalie Grandin /  Nicole Rencken (quarterfinals)
  Ansley Cargill /  Laura Granville (semifinals)
  Tatiana Perebiynis /  Iroda Tulyaganova (final)
  Nives Ćulum /  Sarah Stone (second round)

Draw

Finals

Top half

Bottom half

References

External links

Girls' Doubles
Wimbledon Championship by year – Girls' doubles